Gymnastikos Syllogos Larissas 1928 B.C. (Greek: Γυμναστικός Σύλλογος Λάρισας 1928 K.A.E.), commonly known as Gymnastikos S. Larissas, G.S. Larissas, or G.S.L., is a Greek professional basketball club that is based in Larissa, Greece. The club’s colors are green, white, and blue, and its emblem is the Discobolus. The club is known for being the first professional club team of the legendary European basketball player, Vassilis Spanoulis.

History
Gymnastikos S. Larissas was originally founded in 1928, and it was the first basketball club of the city of Larissa, that played in the top-tier level Greek Basket League (A1 National). In 1979, basketball coach Giannis Ioannidis, after winning the top-tier Greek League championship with Aris, surprisingly agreed to become the head coach of Gymnastikos. Gymnastikos was in the B National (at that time, the Greek 2nd division) at the time, and had great aspirations of being promoted to the top-tier Greek league.

After Ioannidis' team went undefeated in the Greek 2nd Division during the 1979–80 campaign, the team was promoted to the top division in 1980. From that time, and through the 2005–06 season, the club played several times in the top-tier Greek League (in the 1980–81, 1981–82, 1982–83, 1983–84, 1984–85, 1992–93, 1993–94, 1994–95, 1995–96, 1996–97, 1997–98, and 2005–06 seasons). The club's best season to date was the 1994–95 season, when under head coach Vangelis Alexandris' guidance, they almost earned a qualification place in the 3rd-tier European-wide league, the FIBA Korać Cup. They were ultimately denied a place in the Korać Cup by Sporting, by just one point (86–85), in the play-off decider game that determined which team qualified for Korać Cup.

Gymnastikos later suffered relegation to the Greek second division in 1998, but against all odds, they returned to the top flight Greek league in 2005. Despite the club's low budget, they had a good season in the top-tier Greek League, during the 2005–06 season. However, due to financial problems, the club was merged with AEL 1964, in 2006, which again ended its presence in Greece's top basketball league.

Also in 2006, Keravnos Larissa, the club's feeder team, changed their name to Keravnos Gymnastikos, as a reminder of the club's past glory days. Eventually, 9 years later, in 2015, Gymnastikos returned to existence, after merging with another other local club of Larissa, Foinix Larissas. Foinix Larissas had been founded in 1995, and in the previous season, it had played in the 3rd-tier level Greek B League (Beta Ethniki).

Foinix Larissas was then replaced by Gymnastikos S. Larissas, after the two clubs merged in 2015, thus ending Foinix's presence in Greek basketball competitions. The club played in the  3rd-tier level Greek B League during the 2015–16 season, and was promoted to the 2nd-tier level Greek A2 League, for the 2016–17 season.

In the summer of 2017, Gymnastikos merged with Faros Keratsiniou, and then took Faros' place in the upcoming top-tier level Greek Basket League's 2017–18 season. Faros retained all of its amateur and junior clubs. Gymnastikos' club name then officially became Gymnastikos Syllogos Larissas Faros 2017, abbreviated as G.S.L. Faros 2017. In 2018, GSL merged with Ifaistos Limnou. Ifaistos later separated its history from Gymnastikos, and ultimately the club was closed down in 2020. Gymnastikos then retained all of its own history, under its current name of Gymnastikos S. Larissas 1928 B.C.

Arenas
Gymnastikos used the 2,000 seat capacity Alkazar Hall as its home arena for more than 20 years, until 1995, when the Larissa Neapolis Indoor Arena was opened. The club has since played its home games at the Larissa Neapolis, which can seat between 4,000 to 5,500 people for basketball games.

Season by season

Honors and titles
Greek Second Division
Champions (1): 1979–80
Greek Fourth Division
Champions (1): 1989–90

Notable players

Greece:
 Vangelis Alexandris
 Vassilis Angelakopoulos
 Dimitris Bogdanos
 Chris Chougkaz
 Dimitris Despos
 Georgios Diamantakos
 Sotiris Gioulekas
 Nestoras Kommatos
 Christos Konstantinidis
 Achilleas Mamatziolas
 Paris Maragkos
 Vassilis Mouratos
 Manos Papamakarios
 Nikos Papanikolopoulos
 Nondas Papantoniou
 Chris Roupas
 Dimitris Spanoulis
 Vassilis Spanoulis
 Tasos Spyropoulos
 Nikos Stavropoulos
 Kostas Totsios

Europe:
 Darius Dimavičius
 Roeland Schaftenaar
 Teitur Örlygsson

USA:
 Travis Bader
 Walter Bond
 Melvin Cheatum
 Lorenzo Coleman
 Greg Dennis
 James Donaldson
 Richard Dumas
 Chris Garner
 Keith Hill
 Reggie Keely
 Ryan Lorthridge
 Jeremiah Massey
 Marlon Maxey
 Tod Murphy
 Dan Robinson
 Brent Scott
 Deon Thomas
 Sedale Threatt

Rest of Americas:
 Gary Forbes
 José Ortiz
 Chris Webber

NBA players
Over the years, the team has featured players who played in the National Basketball Association (NBA) before or after their stint with Gymnastikos.

 James Donaldson
 Richard Dumas
 Gary Forbes
 Chris Garner
 Ryan Lorthridge
 Marlon Maxey
 Tod Murphy
 José Ortiz
 Brent Scott
 Vassilis Spanoulis
 Sedale Threatt

Head coaches

 Giannis Ioannidis
 Vangelis Alexandris
 Michalis Kyritsis
 Steve Giatzoglou
 Sam Vincent
 Periklis Tavropoulos
 Kostas Pilafidis
 Giannis Tzimas
 Thanasis Skourtopoulos

References

External links 
Greek Basket League Profile 
Official Club Facebook Page 
Official Club Instagram Page 
Official Club YouTube Channel 

Basketball teams established in 1928
Basketball teams in Greece
Sport in Larissa

el:Γυμναστικός Σύλλογος Λάρισας